Dalechampia is a genus of plant of the family Euphorbiaceae and of the monogeneric subtribe Dalechampiinae. It is widespread across lowland tropical areas (generally below 2,000 m ASL) primarily in the Americas with smaller numbers of species in Africa, Madagascar, and southern Asia. Additional new species are still being described and several are very rare and at risk of extinction.

Dalechampia has unisexual flowers that are secondarily united into bisexual blossoms (pseudanthia), which act as the pollination units.  The pollination and floral evolution of this genus have been studied more intensively than perhaps any other member of the euphorbia family. In the neotropics (Americas), most species are pollinated by resin-collecting female bees, including euglossine bees and Hypanthidium of the Megachilidae, which use resin in nest construction. About a dozen neotropical species (including D. spathulata, shown below) are pollinated by fragrance-collecting male euglossine bees, which use these fragrances to attract females for mating. There are at least three independent pollination shifts from pollination by female resin-collecting bees to pollination by male fragrance-collecting bees.   African and Asian species are also pollinated by resin-collecting megachilid bees, but Malagasy species are pollinated by pollen-feeding beetles and pollen-collecting bees.

Two species are of horticultural interest, D. spathulata and D. aristolochiifolia, have particularly showy blossoms with bright pink/purple bracts.  Dalechampia aristolochiifolia, from Peru, has become very popular recently, but it is mistakenly advertised and distributed under the name D. dioscoreifolia.

Species

References

Armbruster WS. 1984. The role of resin in angiosperm pollination: ecological and chemical considerations.  American Journal of Botany 71: 1149–1160.
Armbruster WS. 1985. Patterns of character divergence and the evolution of reproductive ecotypes of Dalechampia scandens (Euphorbiaceae).  Evolution 39: 733–752.
Armbruster WS. 1988. Multilevel comparative analysis of morphology, function, and evolution of Dalechampia blossoms.  Ecology 69: 1746–1761. 
Armbruster WS. 1990. Estimating and testing the shapes of adaptive surfaces: the morphology and pollination of Dalechampia blossoms.  American Naturalist 135: 14–31.
Armbruster WS, Gong Y-B, Huang S-Q.  2011.  Are pollination “syndromes” predictive? --Asian Dalechampia fit neotropical models. American Naturalist 178: 135–143.
Armbruster WS, Lee J, Edwards ME, Baldwin BG. 2013.  Floral paedomorphy leads to secondary specialization in pollination of Madagascar Dalechampia (Euphorbiaceae). Evolution 67:1196–1203. 
Armbruster WS, Herzig AL, 1984. Partitioning and sharing of pollinators by four sympatric species of Dalechampia (Euphorbiaceae) in Panama.  Annals of the Missouri Botanical Garden 71: 1–16.
Webster GL, Armbruster WS.  1991.  A synopsis of the neotropical species of Dalechampia.  Botanical Journal of the Linnean Society, London 105: 137–177.
Webster GL, Webster BD. 1972.  Morphology and relationships of Dalechampia scandens (Euphorbiaceae).  American Journal of Botany 59: 573–586.

Plukenetieae
Euphorbiaceae genera